The 2A46 (also called D-81TM) is a 125 mm/L48 smoothbore cannon of Soviet origin used in several main battle tanks. It was designed by OKB-9 (Artillery Plant No. 9) in Yekaterinburg.

Description
It was developed by the Spetstekhnika Design Bureau in Ekaterinburg in the 1960s originally for the T-64 tank. They were subsequently  manufactured at Artillery Plant No. 9 in Ekaterinburg and Motovilikha in Perm. Other variations include 2A46M, 2A46M-1, 2A46M-2, 2A46M-4, 2A46M-5, and Ukrainian KBA-3 and Chinese ZPT-98.

The 2A46 can fire armour-piercing fin-stabilised discarding sabot (APFSDS), high-explosive anti-tank (HEAT) and high-explosive fragmentation (HEF) projectiles.

The early versions of the 2A46 suffered from a relatively short barrel life, but this was rectified on the 2A46M-1 version. Depending on the version it offers  or from the 2A46M-1  Pmax chamber pressure.

The Ukrainian KBA-3 guns are based on the 2A46 gun. In addition, the Chinese ZPT-98 is based on 2A46M imported from Russia's T-72 or T-80.

Projectiles

Variants

Soviet Union and Russia 

 2A46-1 / DT-81TM (1970): Used on T-64A and T-72A.
 2A46-2 / DT-81K (1976): Used on T-64B and T-80B.
 2A46M (1981): Used on T-72AV and T-72B.
 2A46M-1 (1981): Used on T-64BV, T-72B, T-80BV and T-80U.
 2A46M-2 (1992): Used on T-72S and T-90.
 2A46M-4 (2005): Used on Object 640.
 2A46M-5 (2005): Used on T-90A.
 2A82-1M: Used on T-14 Armata.

China 

 ZPT98: Used on ZTZ96 and ZTZ99.

Ukraine 

 KBA-3: Used on T-84.

Tanks using the 2A46

The 2A46 has been used in numerous tanks, almost exclusively Soviet/Russian designs or foreign derivatives:
  Bangladesh
 Type 59G(BD) Durjoy
 
 Type 96B
 Type 99
 
 M-95 Degman
 M-84D
 
 T-80U
 T-80UK
 
 T-72M4CZ
 T-72M1
 
 T-72SIM1
 
 Zulfiqar
 Karrar
  Iraq
 Asad Babil tank
 
 T-80U
 T-80UK
 
 Chonma-ho V (Ma)
 Pokpung-Ho II & III
 
PT-91M Pendekar
 
 PT-91 Twardy
  Socialist Republic of Romania
 TR-125
  
 T-90
 T-80
 T-72
 T-67 (125mm gun-armed T-62)
 T-64
 T-55M6
 Obyekt 640/Black Eagle
 
 M-84AS
 
 T-84
 T-64
 T-72

T-90S
T-90SK

 M-84

See also
125 mm smoothbore ammunition
2A45 Sprut -  Soviet towed 125 mm anti-tank gun

Weapons of comparable role, performance and era
 L11A5 120 mm rifled gun: British rifled equivalent, developed by Royal Armament Research and Development Established (RARDE) in 1957.
 Rheinmetall 120 mm gun: German equivalent, developed by Rheinmetall in 1974.
 CN120-25 120 mm gun: French equivalent, developed by Établissement d'Études et de Fabrication d'Armements de Bourges (EFAB) in 1979.
 EXP-28M1 120 mm rifled tank gun: Experimental British weapon of the late 1970s/early 1980s. Was to have equipped the MBT-80.
 CN120-26 120 mm gun: French equivalent, developed by EFAB in 1980s.
 IMI 120 mm gun: Israeli equivalent, developed by Israeli Military Industries in 1988.
 OTO Breda 120 mm gun: Italian equivalent, developed by OTO Melara in 1988.
 L30A1 120 mm rifled gun: British rifled equivalent, developed by ROF Nottingham in 1989.
 JSW 120 mm gun: Japanese equivalent, developed by Japan Steel Works in 2008.
 CN08 120 mm gun: South Korean equivalent, developed by Agency for Defense Development (ADD) and WIA in 2008.
 2A82-1M 125 mm gun: New Russian 125-mm equivalent, developed by Uralvagonzavod in 2014.
 MKE 120 mm tank gun: Turkish equivalent, developed by Otokar and Hyundai WIA in 2016.

Sources
http://fofanov.armor.kiev.ua/

References

Notes

External links

125 mm artillery
Tank guns of the Soviet Union
Military equipment introduced in the 1970s